Blackeberg metro station is a station on the Green line of the Stockholm metro. It is located in the district of Blackeberg, which is part of the borough of Bromma in the west of the city of Stockholm. The station has a single island platform, with access from a station building spanning the tracks. Two thirds of the platform is located outdoors and one third is located in a rock tunnel under Blackebergsplan.

The station was inaugurated on 26 October 1952 as a part of the section of line between Hötorget and Vällingby.

The station building was designed by Peter Celsing, who was head of the architectural office of AB Stockholms Spårvägar, the city owned public transport company. The building stands on the northern side of Blackebergsplan and has entrances from the square and, at a lower level, Vinjegatan. The ticket hall floor is at the Vinjegaten level, and a monumental double staircase leads down from the Blackebergsplan entry. The hall has a square floor plan with  sides, and its roof is a flat, free-span dome of reinforced concrete, with an untreated surface. The building is blue-rated by the Stockholm City Museum, which means "that the buildings are judged to have extremely high cultural-historical values".

The tunnel section of the station is decorated with green, blue and yellow tiles. As part of Art in the Stockholm metro project, the station received naturalistic paintings on glazed clinker by Ruben Heleander in 1987.

Gallery

References

External links
Images of Blackeberg station

Green line (Stockholm metro) stations
Railway stations opened in 1952